Farewell Old Friends is the sixth full-length album by the Christian rock band Bleach.  It was released in 2005 under Tooth & Nail Records. This is Bleach's last album and was released after the band disbanded.

Track listing
All tracks by Bleach

"Write It Down" -3:09
"Clear the Air" -4:09
"Gonna Take Some Time" -4:44
"Took It by the Hand" -3:36
"Condition" -3:37
"To the Top" -4:07
"Sufficient" -10:14
"Weight of It All" -2:50
"Good as Gold" -4:24
"Farewell Old Friends" -9:19
"Hidden Track: "I've Been Everywhere..." 3:59 (Johnny Cash cover)

Personnel 
 Sam Barnhart – guitar, vocals
 Dave Baysinger – lead vocals
 Jared Byers – drums
 Milam Byers – lead guitar
 Jerry Morrison – bass guitar

References

Bleach (American band) albums
2005 albums
Tooth & Nail Records albums